The Chemehuevi Mountains are found at the southeast border of San Bernardino County in southeastern California adjacent the Colorado River.

Geography
The mountains are located between U.S. Route 95 and the Topock Gorge of the River, just south of Interstate 40. The Chemehuevi range reaches  at its highpoint, Chemehuevi Peak, located at the range's extreme southwest, bordering Chemehuevi Valley and Wash, where the valley turns due-east to meet the Colorado River.

Chemehuevi Mountains Wilderness

The Chemehuevi Mountains Wilderness Area encompasses the rugged, granitic Chemehuevi Mountains.  The mountain range is horseshoe-shaped, with the open end facing eastward toward the Colorado River.  Contained within the arms of the horseshoe is a large central valley with low rolling hills covered by dense stands of cholla and other cacti, ocotillo, and an occasional agave.

Viewed from the west, the striking light, almost white, granite peaks contrast sharply with the rich green creosote and cactus-covered bajadas.  A few miles from the Colorado River, the mountains change dramatically from light-colored granite to dark red and gray volcanic spires and mesas.

See also
:Category:Mountain ranges of the Mojave Desert
:Category:Protected areas of the Mojave Desert
:Category:Flora of the California desert regions

References

California Road and Recreation Atlas, 2005, pg. 115.

External links
Chemehuevi Mountains Wilderness Area website
 BLM Chemehuevi Mountains Wilderness Map
Chemehuevi Mountains Wilderness photographs

Mountain ranges of the Mojave Desert
Protected areas of the Mojave Desert
Mountain ranges of the Lower Colorado River Valley
Mountain ranges of San Bernardino County, California
Bureau of Land Management areas in California
Protected areas of San Bernardino County, California